Lake Santeetlah, part of the Tennessee River watershed, was created in 1928 when Alcoa dammed the Cheoah River as a means of generating hydroelectric power in Graham County, North Carolina.  The reservoir is largely surrounded by the Cheoah District of the Nantahala National Forest. During the last decades of the twentieth century non-public lands were developed as scenic residences and vacation homes, most notably in the area now incorporated as the town of Lake Santeetlah.

Although the area below the highwater mark continues to be managed by Alcoa, approximately 80% of the surrounding land is under the jurisdiction of the U.S. Forest Service, which provides swimming, camping, picnicking, fishing and boating facilities.  Lake Santeetlah has 76 miles of shore line and is home to a variety of trout, muskie, crappie, and bass. Of special note is the adjoining Joyce Kilmer Memorial Forest, which was set aside in 1936 as a memorial to poet-soldier Joyce Kilmer, and is perhaps "the most impressive example of original, old growth forest" in the eastern United States.

References

Little Tennessee River
Santeetlah
Bodies of water of Graham County, North Carolina
Protected areas of Graham County, North Carolina